Debenham & Freebody was a department store at 27–37 Wigmore Street, London, which became part of the Debenhams chain. The building is now used by a variety of occupiers and is grade II listed by Historic England.

In popular culture 
In Agatha Christie's Murder on the Orient Express, a suspect gives the name Freebody in a fumbled attempt to divert suspicion away from another suspect, named Debenham.

References

External links 

Grade II listed buildings in the City of Westminster
Grade II listed retail buildings
Debenhams